Etezadiyeh (also Romanized as E‘teẕādīyeh) is a village in Ivughli Rural District, Ivughli District, Khoy County, West Azerbaijan Province, Iran. At the 2006 census, its population was 90, in 23 families.

References 

Populated places in Khoy County